MHU may refer to:

Education
 Maharana Pratap Horticultural University, Karnal district, Haryana, India
 Mars Hill University, North Carolina
 Motherhood University, Haridwar district, Uttarakhand, India

Other uses
 ISO 639:mhu or Digaro Mishmi language, spoken in India
 Mount Hotham Airport, Australia (by IATA code)
 Mouse Habitat Unit, a science experiment taken to the International Space Station on Kounotori 5